Aminu Kano (9 August 1920 — 17 April 1983) was a Muslim politician from Nigeria born at Sudawa, Gwale Local Government and resided at Gwammaja, Dala Local Government. In the 1940s he led a socialist movement in the northern part of the country in opposition to British rule. The Mallam Aminu Kano International Airport, the Aminu Kano Teaching Hospital, and the Aminu Kano College of Islamic Studies all in Kano,  are named after him. He was a relative to the father of former Head of State Murtala Mohammed, former Minister of Defense Inuwa Wada and former Minister of Foreign Affairs Aminu Bashir Wali.

Life and early career on 
Aminu Kano was born 9 August 1920 to the family of an Islamic scholar, Mallam Yusufu, a mufti at the Alkali court in Kano, and Rakiya. His father was of the Gyanawa fulani clan, a lineage known for producing judicial scholars while his mother was from the Fulata Borno family of Mamman Zara an Islamic Scholar, his paternal grandfather Hassan resided in Yakasai in Kano Municipal and was a wealthy merchant.

Aminu attended Katsina College and later went to the University of London's, Institute of Education, alongside Sir Abubakar Tafawa Balewa. He earned his teaching certificate after completing his studies at Katsina College and subsequently became a teacher; he started teaching at the Bauchi training College.

While in Bauchi, he spoke freely on political issues and extended his educational horizon by engaging in some various political and educational activities beyond his formal teaching duties. For instance, he wrote a controversial pamphlet, 'Kano, Under the Hammer of the Native Administration. In 1943, he founded the Bauchi General Improvement Union (BGIU) together with Sa'adu Zungur and Balewa. This organization originated from the Bauchi Discussion Circle, a group whose activities were later constricted as a result of an attack on indirect rule by Aminu Kano. Although short-lived, the BGIU is considered as the first political party in northern Nigeria.

In 1948, he became the head of the teacher training center in Maru, Sokoto and was also the secretary of the Northern Teachers Association. During this period, he established an organization to improve the quality of Qur'anic schools in the north.

Pre-Independence and first republic
While in Sokoto, he became a member of Jam'iyyar Mutanen Arewa, a Northern Nigeria cultural association that later evolved into a political party and became the dominant party in Northern Nigeria during the Nigerian First Republic. However, in 1950, he led a splinter group of young radicals from Jam'iyyar Mutanen Arewa, and formed the Northern Elements Progressive Union (NEPU). Notably, a few years earlier, an Igbira man and trader, Habib Raji Abdallah had founded an organization called the Northern Elements Progressive Association in Kano. The organization was founded along the nationalistic political thoughts of Nnamdi Azikiwe. In 1949, a few of Azikiwe's supporters were jailed including Abdallah, leading to the breakup of the organization

Nevertheless, a new progressive union led by Aminu Kano and composed of progressive leaning teachers and some radical [intellectuals] such as Magaji Dambatta, Abba Maikwaru and Bello Ijumu emerged to fill any vacuum in political radicalism in the region. The members were largely connected together in their opposition to the management style of the native administration in Northern Nigeria. In 1951, the party contested for seats in the Kano primary elections and was fairly successful. However, with the formation of the Northern People's Congress, Mallam Aminu began to face formidable challenges especially in two federal elections. In 1954, Aminu Kano lost a federal House of Representative seat to Maitama Sule and in 1956, he failed to clinch enough votes to win a seat on the Northern Regional Assembly. It wasn't until the 1959 parliamentary election that he succeeded in gaining a major regional seat. He won the Kano East federal seat as a candidate of NEPU, which was already in alliance with the National Council of Nigeria and the Cameroons. While in the Federal House of Representative, he was a deputy Chief Whip.

After the first republic was cut short by a military coup. Aminu Kano later served in the military government of General Yakubu Gowon as a federal commissioner for health.

Second republic
After 12 years, the military government in September 1978, lifted its proscription of political parties. In the following months, five newly formed parties began to emerge: the Nigerian People's Party, the Unity Party of Nigeria and three others. Among them was the People's Redemption Party, led by Aminu Kano, Michael Imoudu, S.G. Ikoku, and Edward Ikem Okeke, other party members included Abubakar Rimi, Sabo Bakin Zuwo, Abdullahi Aliyu Sumaila, Umaru Musa Yar'adua , Sule Lamido and Ghali Umar Na'Abba. The party leaned towards a populist framework and enjoyed the support of prominent labor leaders such as Michael Imoudu. In 1979, the party presented Aminu Kano as its presidential candidate but he could not muster enough votes to win. Nevertheless, the party won two gubernatorial seats.

Reformist ideas
Aminu Kano joined the Northern Elements Progressive Union as a political platform to challenge what he felt was the autocratic and feudalistic actions of the Native Northern Government. He geared his attack on the ruling elite including the emirs, who were mostly Fulanis. The potency of his platform was strengthened partly because of his background. His father was an acting Alkali in Kano who came from a lineage of Islamic clerics, Aminu Kano also brought up Islamic ideas on equity in his campaign trails during the first republic. Many talakawas (commoners) in Kano lined up behind his message and his political stature grew from the support of the Kano commoners and migratory petty traders in the north. Many of the tradesmen later manned the offices of NEPU. He also sought to use politics to create an egalitarian Northern Nigerian society.

Another major idea of his in the prelude to the first republic was the breakup of ethnically based parties. The idea was well received by his emerging support base of petty traders and craftsmen in towns along the rail track. The men and women were mostly migratory individuals searching for trade opportunities and had little ethnic similarities with their host communities. He also proposed a fiscal system that favors heavy taxation of the rich in the region and was notably one of the few leading Nigerian politicians that supported equal rights for women.

Mallam Aminu Kano is highly respected politician in Northern Nigeria. He symbolized democratization, women's empowerment and freedom of speech. An airport, a college and also a major street are also named after him in Kano. His house where he lived and died and buried has been converted to Centre for Democratic Research and Training under the Bayero University Kano.

Political quotes

See also
People's Redemption Party

References

Further reading
 
 

Politicians from Kano
1920 births
1983 deaths
People's Redemption Party politicians
Members of the House of Representatives (Nigeria)
Alumni of the UCL Institute of Education
Politics of Northern Nigeria
Candidates in the 1979 Nigerian presidential election
Nigerian schoolteachers
Candidates in the 1983 Nigerian presidential election